Dametir or Damatir, also rendered as Damitar, may refer to:
 Dametir-e Jonubi
 Dametir-e Shomali